Arnoseris is a monotypic genus of flowering plants in the family Asteraceae.

The only known species is  Arnoseris minima, native to Europe, Morocco, and the Middle East; naturalized in parts of northeastern North America (Nova Scotia, New Brunswick, Prince Edward Island, Maine, New Hampshire, Pennsylvania, Ohio, Michigan). Common names in the United States: dwarf nipplewort or lamb-succory. Common names in the British Isles: lamb's succory.

It has a maximum height of 30 cm, is herbaceous and does not spread vegetatively.

The species became extinct across the British Isles in 1971. There was an attempt to reintroduce the species, and there has been one recent sighting in England.

Arnoseris minima is an annual weed of cornfields and fallow fields, favouring infertile, sandy, acidic soils.

The word 'succory' is an anglicization of the French 'cichorie' (chicory). The 'lamb' in the name denotes that it is a chicory only suitable for animal consumption. The genus Arnoseris comes from the Ancient Greek 'arnos seris' meaning 'sheep's endive'. The species epithet minima means 'small'.

Secondary metabolites 
Arnoseris minima is a source of the simple coumarin aesculetin and the flavonoids luteolin, luteolin 7-O-β-D-glucoside, luteolin 4'-O-β-D-glucoside, and 3-O-methylquercetin.

References 

Monotypic Asteraceae genera
Asteraceae genera
Flora of Europe
Flora of Morocco
Cichorieae